Manitoulin District is a district in Northeastern Ontario within the Canadian province of Ontario. It was created in 1888 from part of the Algoma District. The district seat is in Gore Bay.

It comprises Manitoulin Island primarily, as well as a number of smaller islands surrounding it, such as Barrie, Cockburn, and Great La Cloche islands. Previously it included the municipality of Killarney on the mainland, until this was transferred to Sudbury District in the late 1990s.

Geography
It is in the northern part of Lake Huron, separated from the mainland by the North Channel to the north and by the Georgian Bay to the east.

Islands included within the district are:

 Barrie Island
 Bedford Island
 Burnt Islands (Big and Northwest)
 Clapperton Island
 Club Island
 Cockburn Island
 Duck Islands (Great, Middle, Outer, and Western)
 East Rous Island
 Fitzwilliam Island
 Goat Island
 Great La Cloche Island
 Greene Island
 Henry Island
 Heywood Island
 Manitoulin Island
 Rabbit Island
 Strawberry Island
 Thibault Island
 Vidal Island
 Wall Island
 Yeo Island

Subdivisions

Towns

Townships

Unorganized areas

First Nations reserves

Communities

 Advance
 Bass Creek
 Bidwell
 Big Lake
 Bowser's Corner
 Britainville
 Burnt Island
 Burpee
 Clover Valley
 Cold Springs
 Cook's Dock
 Dinner Point Depot
 Dryden's Corner
 Eads Bush
 Eagles Nest
 Elizabeth Bay
 Evansville
 Fernlee
 Foxey
 Gibraltar
 Green Bay
 Grimsthorpe
 Hilly Grove
 Honora
 Ice Lake
 Kagawong
 Little Current
 Long Bay
 Manitowaning
 Meldrum Bay
 Michael's Bay
 Mindemoya
 Monument Corner
 Old Spring Bay
 Perivale
 Pleasant Valley
 Poplar
 Providence Bay
 Rockville
 Sandfield
 Sheguiandah
 Silver Water
 The Slash
 Snowville
 South Baymouth
 Spring Bay
 Squirrel Town
 Tobacco Lake
 Tolsmaville
 Turner
 Vanzant's Point

Demographics

Services
Like the other districts of Northern Ontario, the Manitoulin District does not have a county or regional municipality tier of government. All services in the district are provided either by the individual municipalities or directly by the provincial government. Services are provided jointly with the Sudbury District from its district seat in Espanola.

Media
The district is served by two weekly community newspapers, the Manitoulin Expositor in Little Current and the Manitoulin West Recorder in Gore Bay; the papers are sister publications both owned and operated by the McCutcheon family.

The district is served by the commercial radio stations CFRM-FM and CHAW-FM, the First Nations community radio station CHYF-FM, and the Elliot Lake-based commercial radio station CKNR-FM. It is otherwise primarily served by media from Sudbury, including the Sudbury Star and CTV Northern Ontario.

Highways

King's Highways
 #6

Secondary Highways
 #540
 #540A
 #540B
 #542
 #542A
 #551

See also
 List of townships in Ontario
 Manitoulin Streams Improvement Association - A not-for-profit group that rehabilitates streams, rivers, and creeks on Manitoulin Island.
 List of secondary schools in Ontario#Manitoulin District

References

External links

Manitoulin-Sudbury District Services Board